Maria Evgenievna Pavlova (born 2 August 2004) is a Russian pair skater who currently competes for Hungary. With her former partner, Balázs Nagy, she is the 2022 Hungarian national silver medalist and finished 11th at the 2022 European Championships.

With partner, Alexei Sviatchenko, she is the 2023 Hungarian national champion and finished 5th at the 2023 European Championships.

Personal life 
Pavlova was born on 2 August 2004 in Moscow, Russia.

Programs

With Sviatchenko

With Nagy

Competitive highlights 
''CS: Challenger Series

With Sviatchenko for Hungary

With Nagy for Hungary

References

External links 
 

2004 births
Living people
Russian female pair skaters
Hungarian female pair skaters
Figure skaters from Moscow